The Stock Pavilion is part of the University of Wisconsin–Madison.

History
The pavilion was primarily built to exhibit the University of Wisconsin's livestock. It has also been the site of numerous other events, including a Sergei Rachmaninoff concert and speeches by U.S. Presidents Theodore Roosevelt, William Howard Taft, Harry S. Truman, and civil rights leader Martin Luther King Jr. The building was listed on the National Register of Historic Places in 1985 and on the State Register of Historic Places in 1989.

References

Further reading
 

University and college buildings on the National Register of Historic Places in Wisconsin
National Register of Historic Places in Madison, Wisconsin
Pavilions in the United States
University of Wisconsin–Madison
Buildings and structures in Madison, Wisconsin
Tudor Revival architecture in Wisconsin
Buildings and structures completed in 1909